The 1955 Tennessee A&I Tigers football team represented Tennessee Agricultural & Industrial State College as a member of the Midwest Athletic Association (MAA) during the 1955 college football season. In their first season under head coach Howard C. Gentry, the Tigers compiled a 7–2 record and outscored all opponents by a total of 245 to 84. Tennessee A&I was ranked No. 4 in the Pittsburgh Courier final rankings of black college football teams.

Schedule

References

Tennessee A&I
Tennessee State Tigers football seasons
Tennessee A&I Tigers